Ninoslav Parmaković (born 24 November 1982) is a Croatian football player who played as defender.

Club career
During his career he also had spells at Kamen Ingrad, Zadar, Slavonija Požega and Cibalia, as well as the second-level side Dilj.

International career
Parmaković was also capped for the Croatia national team at several youth levels between 1998 and 2003.

References

External links

1982 births
Living people
Sportspeople from Vinkovci
Association football defenders
Croatian footballers
Croatia youth international footballers
HNK Cibalia players
NK Kamen Ingrad players
NK Zadar players
Croatian Football League players
First Football League (Croatia) players